Gillan is a hamlet in the parish of St Anthony-in-Meneage, Cornwall, England. Gillan Creek is one of the creeks of the Helford River.

Gillan lies within the Cornwall Area of Outstanding Natural Beauty (AONB).

References

Hamlets in Cornwall